The Protestant Church of Geneva (EPG) is an organization of congregations in the Canton of Geneva. It was founded in 1536 during the Protestant Reformation. It was the state church of Geneva from its inception until 1907. It is a member of the Federation of Swiss Protestant Churches, and through that body a member of the World Council of Churches and the World Communion of Reformed Churches. As of 2003, the church had approximately 94,472 members, of which 15,095 were baptized. The ministers of the church are organized in the Company of Pastors and the Genevan Consistory functions as a sort of parliament of the church.
Female ordination is allowed.

References

External links
Official site

Geneva
Geneva
Organisations based in Geneva
Geneva